People Under the Stairs (also known as PUTS) was an American hip hop group from Los Angeles, California, formed in 1997. The group consists solely of two members, Thes One (Christopher Portugal) and Double K (Michael Turner), who share between them the duties of MCing, DJing and producing.

The discography of People Under The Stairs consists of twelve studio albums, two compilations, eighteen singles, one live DVD and many other releases, collaborations and guest appearances.

Albums

Studio albums

Compilation albums

Extended plays

Singles

Videos

DVDs

Web animation

Music videos

Other official releases

Side projects

Guest appearances

On compilations

Featured performers

Production

Remixing

References

External links
Complete release list on The Point of the Rhyme
People Under The Stairs on Allmusic
People Under The Stairs on Discogs

Hip hop discographies
Discographies of American artists